Caelo may refer to:

A misspelling of Carlo
On the Heavens (De Caelo in Latin), a treatise in cosmology by the ancient Greek philosopher Aristotle
"servare de caelo", a phrase in the Glossary of ancient Roman religion